David Scott Mann (born September 25, 1939) is an American lawyer and politician. A member of the Democratic Party, he served as the United States representative for Ohio's 1st congressional district from 1993 to 1995. He also served as a member of the Cincinnati City Council from 2013 to 2022 and from 1974 to 1992, during which time he served as mayor of Cincinnati from 1980 to 1982 and again in 1991. Mann ran in the 2021 Cincinnati mayoral election, but lost to Hamilton County Clerk of Courts Aftab Pureval.

Early life
At the time of his birth, Mann's parents resided in Park Hills, a Northern Kentucky suburb of Cincinnati. During his father's service in the United States Navy in World War II, Mann lived with his mother in her hometown of Horse Cave, Kentucky before moving to his father's assignment of the Bronx. His family later settled in Cincinnati.

Mann completed his secondary education at Dixie Heights High School before attending Harvard University on a Navy ROTC scholarship, graduating cum laude in 1961 with a degree in biochemical science. After graduating, Mann served in the  Navy from 1961 to 1965. As a lieutenant, Mann served aboard the destroyer USS English during the Cuban Missile Crisis. Mann was a supporter of President John F. Kennedy; Mann credits Kennedy's assassination with convincing him to attend law school instead of medical school so that he could better engage in public service. After his time in the navy, Mann attended Harvard Law School and was awarded a Bachelor of Laws degree magna cum laude in 1968. He was an editor of the Harvard Law Review. Mann returned to the Cincinnati metropolitan area after graduation so that he would be closer to family.

Political career

Early political involvement
Mann put up yard signs for Jack Gilligan's unsuccessful 1968 Senate campaign; he originally intended to help write Gilligan's policy proposals, but the campaign did not accept his request. He later contributed to Tom Luken's campaign for a seat on the Cincinnati City Council.

Initial municipal career
Mann was a member of Cincinnati's board of health from 1972 to 1974. Luken encouraged him to run for a seat on the City Council, but Mann's first attempt in 1973 was unsuccessful. The following year, Mann replaced Jerry Springer on the Council after Springer resigned due to a prostitution scandal. Mann served as mayor of Cincinnati twice during his time on the Council, first from December 1980 to November 1982 and then from January to November 1991. He left the Council in 1992.

Congress

Mann was the Democratic nominee for Ohio's 1st congressional district in the 1992 House of Representatives elections, narrowly defeating State Senator William Bowen in the primary. Mann won a roughly 8-point victory over Republican-backed independent Steve Grote in the general election. Mann began serving in the 103rd United States Congress in 1993. While in the House, he sponsored five bills and served on the House Armed Services and House Judiciary Committees. Mann voted against President Bill Clinton's stimulus package and budget proposal and was skeptical towards Clinton's health care plan. Mann also supported further investigation into the Whitewater controversy. Mann voted for the 1994 Crime Bill, which he later said he regretted.

Mann voted in favor of the North American Free Trade Agreement, which damaged his reputation with some of his allies in organized labor. Bowen, with the support of several prominent labor unionists, attempted to primary Mann in 1994; Mann won renomination by 667 votes. Unions were divided on Mann's general election campaign, with some, such as the Ohio Education Association, endorsing him, while others, such as the Cincinnati AFL–CIO Labor Council, refused to do so. Mann ultimately lost his bid for re-election to Republican Steve Chabot in the "Republican Revolution". Mann left office in 1995.

Later municipal career
Mann returned to politics in 2013, running for and winning a seat on the Cincinnati City Council. He was simultaneously endorsed by the Democratic Party and the Charter Committee. In 2014, Mann became vice mayor, a position which he would hold until 2018. Mann often served as a mediator between Mayor John Cranley and Cranley's opponents on the Council, helping broker deals on a number of issues.  In 2015, Mann reached a compromise with Cranley on a budget dispute, preventing a government shutdown.

Mann was re-elected in 2017. In 2018, Mann became the chair of the Council's Budget and Finance Committee, which is responsible for the city's finances. That same year, Mann proposed levying an excise tax on short-term rentals, with the proceeds going to the city's affordable housing fund. Mann stated that the tax would "strike a balance between preserving and funding affordable housing units and community in neighborhoods, encouraging tourism and entrepreneurship through short-term rentals, and ensuring that all visitors to Cincinnati are staying in units that are safe and up to code". The proposal was implemented in 2019.

In May 2020, Mann announced that he would participate in the 2021 Cincinnati mayoral election. With 29% of the vote in the nonpartisan mayoral primary, Mann came in second place and advanced to the general election. He lost the general election to Hamilton County Clerk of Courts Aftab Pureval.

Other ventures
Mann joined the Ohio State Bar Association in 1968. From 1995 to 2001, he taught at the University of Cincinnati College of Law. In 1997, Mann and his son Michael founded their own law firm, Mann & Mann. The firm primarily handles tax law and employment discrimination cases.

Mann has served on the boards of numerous charitable organizations, including the Make-A-Wish Foundation and the Freestore Foodbank.

Personal life
Mann lives in Clifton with his wife, Betsy. They have three children. Mann is a Methodist.

Electoral history

Write-in and minor candidate notes:  In 1992, write-ins received 11 votes.

Notes

See also
 List of United States representatives from Ohio

References

External links

 

|-

|-

|-

1939 births
21st-century American politicians
Methodists from Ohio
Candidates in the 2021 United States elections
Cincinnati City Council members
Democratic Party members of the United States House of Representatives from Ohio
Dixie Heights High School alumni
Harvard Law School alumni
Living people
Mayors of Cincinnati
Ohio lawyers
University of Cincinnati College of Law faculty